William Ashburnham, 2nd Baron Ashburnham (21 May 1679 – 16 June 1710) was an English landowner and Tory politician who sat in the English and British House of Commons from 1702 until 1710, when he succeeded to the peerage as Baron Ashburnham and entered the House of Lords.

Ashburnham was the eldest son of John Ashburnham, 1st Baron Ashburnham, and his wife Bridget Vaughan, daughter of Walter Vaughan, of  Porthammel House, Brecknockshire.  

Ashburnham was put forward by his father for Hastings at the second general election of 1701, but was defeated. However at the 1702 English general election, he was returned unopposed as Member of Parliament for Hastings. His only known action in Parliament was to act as teller with regard to the occasional conformity bill. He was returned unopposed again for Hastings at the 1705 English general election and voted against the Court candidate for Speaker on 25 October 1705.  At the 1708 British general election, he was returned unopposed again as a Tory for Hastings. He succeeded his father in the barony on 21  January 1710, and vacated his seat in the House of Commons.  He was also briefly Custos Rotulorum of Brecknockshire in 1710.

Ashburnham married Catherine Taylor, daughter of Thomas Taylor, of Clapham, Bedfordshire, in 1705. The marriage was childless. He died on 16 June 1710, aged 31, from smallpox, and was buried at Ashburnham. Lady Ashburnham also died from smallpox less than a month later, aged 23. He was succeeded in the peerage by his younger brother, John.

References

1679 births
1710 deaths
Barons Ashburnham
18th-century English landowners
English MPs 1702–1705
English MPs 1705–1707